20 minutes is a French-language newspaper published in Switzerland, launched on 8 March 2006 by Tamedia for the Romandie.  As of 2008, it had a circulation of 221,560.

See also 
 List of free daily newspapers
 List of newspapers in Switzerland

External links
 20min.ch/ro (in French), the newspaper's official website

2006 establishments in Switzerland
Free daily newspapers
French-language newspapers published in Switzerland
Publications established in 2006